Pagoda Creek is an archeological site which was listed on the National Register of Historic Places in 2017.

It is located in Park County, Wyoming, in the vicinity of Wapiti, Wyoming, along the North Fork of the Shoshone River between Yellowstone and Cody, Wyoming. 

According to the state of Wyoming, "This scenic location is winter habitat for elk, bighorn sheep and mule deer. Between 2,730 and 2,799 years ago this site was used in mid-winter as a place to butcher and process bighorn sheep and mule deer that were killed nearby. Upwind from hearths at the site are artifacts indicating stone tool maintenance and manufacture. Downwind from the hearths are discarded bones. The bones have cut marks from butchering and were also busted up to remove the nutritious bone marrow. Parts of the site are well preserved and have potential to provide further information about this period. / The site was excavated in 1985 by a crew from the Office of the Wyoming State Archaeologist led by Dan Eakin prior to a road improvement project."

References

Archaeological sites on the National Register of Historic Places in Wyoming
National Register of Historic Places in Park County, Wyoming